Goodbye Angel may refer to:

Music
 "Goodbye Angel", a song by Fleetwood Mac from 25 Years – The Chain
 "Goodbye Angel", a song by Loverboy from Six (Loverboy album)
 "Goodbye Angel", a song by Red Hot Chili Peppers from The Getaway